Daria Pavlovna Serebriakova (born 23 April 1995) is a Russian female badminton player.

Achievements

BWF International Challenge/Series (1 title, 2 runners-up)
Women's Doubles

 BWF International Challenge tournament
 BWF International Series tournament
 BWF Future Series tournament

References

External links 

1995 births
Living people
People from Orekhovo-Zuyevo
Badminton players from Moscow
Russian female badminton players
21st-century Russian women